Menthon-Saint-Bernard, commonly referred to simply as Menthon, is a commune on the eastern shore of Lake Annecy in the Haute-Savoie department in the Auvergne-Rhône-Alpes region in Southeastern France. In 2018, it had a population of 1,884.

History
At the waterfront of Lake Annecy in the commune of Menthon-Saint-Bernard, traces of prehistoric and later Gallo-Roman occupation have been found. Over the next centuries, at the foot of the Château de Menthon-Saint-Bernard, a few hamlets evolved.

Menthon-Saint-Bernard has become a noted resort place since the late 19th century because of its thermal baths, already in use in the Roman era and later under the Société des Bains de Menthon, as well as its proximity to Annecy and the mountain settlements of Manigod, La Clusaz, La Croix Fry and Le Grand-Bornand. One of the most noted hotels in Menthon-Saint-Bernard, the Palace de Menthon, is housed in a waterfront building opened in 1906 by the Gruffaz brothers.

See also
Communes of the Haute-Savoie department
Bernard of Menthon

References

Communes of Haute-Savoie